The Philadelphia International Championship was an annual bicycle race held in Philadelphia, Pennsylvania. It was described as "America's top international cycling classic, and one of the richest and most prestigious one day races outside of Europe." The men's event was ranked 1.1 by the International Cycling Union (UCI), the sport's governing body, which made it the highest ranked single-day race in the Western Hemisphere after the UCI World Tour Grand Prix Cycliste de Montreal and Grand Prix Cycliste de Quebec. It was part of the UCI America Tour.

The race had existed since 1985, but its name changed a number of times, because of the changing of names of its corporate sponsors, due to bank mergers and acquisitions. The title sponsor was originally CoreStates Bank, followed by First Union Bank in 1998, then Wachovia Bank in 2002. In November 2005, Wachovia withdrew its sponsorship. With assistance from former Philadelphia mayor and then-Pennsylvania governor Ed Rendell, a corporate sponsor was found in 2006; Commerce Bank made a four-year commitment. Due to its acquisition by Toronto-Dominion Bank in 2007, Commerce Bank became TD Bank in 2008.

The Philadelphia International Championship was once the final leg of a one-week, 3-race circuit called the TD Bank Triple Crown of Cycling.  The races took place in Lancaster, Reading and Philadelphia.  The opening race was the Lancaster Classic, followed four days later by the Reading Classic, with the finale in Philadelphia three days after that.

Through 2005, the highest placed finisher registered in the United States was named the USPRO champion, whether or not he won the race.  The race was often called the USPRO Championship; however, USA Cycling, the national governing body, stripped the Philadelphia race of the USPRO title, wanting to limit the race to Americans. Local organizers insisted the field remain open to the pros from all around the world.

There was a men's and a women's race, the latter called the Liberty Classic. The seven-lap men's race consisted of a three-lap  opening circuit, followed by seven  laps of the primary circuit, then a five-lap 4.8 km closing circuit.

The race started on the Benjamin Franklin Parkway and then headed along Kelly Drive into the northwest section of the city, through East Falls, Manayunk, and Roxborough, then returned to the Parkway and Logan Circle to complete its loop, passing parts of Fairmount Park along the way.

Top cyclists who have participated include Eric Heiden, who won the race in 1985, Greg LeMond, and Lance Armstrong, who started his professional career when he won the race in 1993.

The cancellation of the 2017 races was announced by the UCI at the end of January 2017, citing difficulty in obtaining sponsorship resulting in financial difficulties for the organisers.

Manayunk Wall 

In bicycling terminology, a "wall" is a steep incline. The Manayunk Wall, located by Jerry Casale and David Chauner when they were laying out the course in 1985, refers to Levering Street and Lyceum Avenue in northwest Philadelphia.  It begins at Main Street and Levering Street in the neighborhood of Manayunk, proceeds on the well-worn cobblestone Cresson Street under the elevated railway, then back on to Levering Street.

Most of the Wall is part of Levering Street, but it becomes Lyceum Avenue at Tower Street.  The steepest section, a 17-percent grade, commences just after the slight left turn when going up at the intersection with Tower Street, and ends at the intersection with Fleming street. It becomes less steep on the stretch with O'Brien's as it crosses Manayunk Avenue.  It nearly flattens and ends at Pechin Street in Roxborough, which most news crews set up for broadcasting. The right turn off Lyceum Avenue onto Pechin Street begins The Fall from the Wall. Manayunk Avenue is the boundary of Manayunk and Roxborough.

O'Brien's Water Hole along the wall sets up a water sprinkler for cyclists to ride through. In early years, no one seemed to mind but as the race became more important, it was criticized as a distraction and reduced.

On June 5, 2002, Manayunk designated the 17-percent grade as the Manayunk Wall.  Olympic gold medalist Marty Nothstein presented a plaque.

Downhill Race 

At midnight, the morning of the international championship, an unlicensed race down The Wall took place from 1996-2006.  "The Downhill"  was conceived at Dawson Street Pub.  Racers gathered there to walk to The Wall.  The race started at Manayunk Avenue and Lyceum Avenue and continued to the bottom of the hill or until where police blocked the street.  The race included BMX bikes, tricycles, shopping carts, wheelchairs, skateboards, bed frames and roller skates.  The event grew in popularity after being promoted on a radio station in 2003 and several thousand spectators attended in 2006. A young man was injured during the 2006 race when he was blindsided by another individual who was careening down the wall in a shopping cart. Police are generally credited as permanently stopping the race.
On September 6, 2008 the Red Bull Soapbox Race was held at the Manayunk Wall.

Past winners

General classification 
 Also served as USPRO Championships for USA riders up to 2005

VisitPA.com Best Climber’s Award

See also 

 Cycling
 List of road bicycle racing events

References

External links 

Harvard Business Review report
Hoovers review
Downhill Race Video

Cycle races in the United States
Sports in Philadelphia
Recurring sporting events established in 1985
1985 establishments in Pennsylvania
Recurring sporting events disestablished in 2016
2016 disestablishments in Pennsylvania
UCI America Tour races
Cycling in Pennsylvania